The Re 460 (popularly known as the Lok 2000) series are modern four-axle electric locomotives of the Swiss Federal Railways.

The series was introduced as part of the Rail 2000 project, a massive project to modernise and improve the capacity of Switzerland's railways. While originally designed as a multipurpose locomotive, they are now used for passenger services only, often in conjunction with the IC 2000 double-decker trains (often used to pull InterCity and InterRegio trains in German and French language areas). Their freight role has been assumed by Re 482s. They are maintained at Yverdon.

Assignment 

When SBB was split up on 1 September 1999, Re 460 079–118 were assigned to the freight division, later becoming SBB Cargo. It was seen as an advantage to use all Re 460, which had been designed for 200 km/h, for passenger service. The passenger division passed the Re 6/6 to SBB Cargo and bought 079–095 on 1 January 2003, 096–102 2004, and the rest 2005.

Advertising
Due in part to their large, mainly flat bodysides, Swiss Federal Railways were approached early on with requests for the Re 460 to be used as mobile advertising hoardings. Despite opposition from some quarters, the money that could be earned swayed the decision, and the first such locomotive, Re 460 015 was unveiled in 1994 in Agfa livery. Today no other loco type in Switzerland carries so many different liveries.

Naming
Almost all Re 460 locomotives are named, with the names being applied below the cab window at one end.

List of names:

 Re 460 000	Grauholz
 Re 460 001	Lötschberg
 Re 460 002	Seeland
 Re 460 003	Millieu du Monde
 Re 460 004	Uetliberg
 Re 460 005	Val d'Anniviers
 Re 460 006	Lavaux
 Re 460 007	Junior
 Re 460 008	La Gruyère
 Re 460 009	Le jet d´eau
 Re 460 010	Löwenberg
 Re 460 011	Léman
 Re 460 012	Erguël
 Re 460 013	Nord Vaudois
 Re 460 014	Val du Trient
 Re 460 015	Dübendorf II
 Re 460 016	Rohrdorferberg Reusstal
 Re 460 017	Les Diablerets
 Re 460 018	—
 Re 460 019	Terre Sainte
 Re 460 020	Idée suisse
 Re 460 021	—
 Re 460 022	Sihl
 Re 460 023	Wankdorf
 Re 460 024	Rheintal
 Re 460 025	Striegel
 Re 460 026	Fricktal
 Re 460 027	Joggeli
 Re 460 028	Seetal
 Re 460 029	Eulach
 Re 460 030	Säntis
 Re 460 031	Chaumont
 Re 460 032	—
 Re 460 033	—
 Re 460 034	Aare
 Re 460 035	—
 Re 460 036	Franches-Montagnes
 Re 460 037	Sempacher See
 Re 460 038	Hauenstein
 Re 460 039	Rochers de Naye
 Re 460 040	Napf
 Re 460 041	Mendrisiotto
 Re 460 042	Albis
 Re 460 043	Dreispitz
 Re 460 044	Zugerland
 Re 460 045	Rigi
 Re 460 046	Polmengo
 Re 460 047	Maderanertal
 Re 460 048	Züri Wyland
 Re 460 049	Pfannenstiel
 Re 460 050	Züspa
 Re 460 051	Staffelegg
 Re 460 052	Eigenamt
 Re 460 053	Suhrental
 Re 460 054	Dreiländereck
 Re 460 055	Lillehammer
 Re 460 056	—
 Re 460 057	Val-de-Ruz
 Re 460 058	La Côte
 Re 460 059	La Béroche

 Re 460 060	Val-de-Travers
 Re 460 061	Wiggertal
 Re 460 062	Ergolz
 Re 460 063	Brunegg
 Re 460 064	Mythen
 Re 460 065	Rotsee
 Re 460 066	Finse
 Re 460 067	Hohle Gasse
 Re 460 068	Gütsch
 Re 460 069	Verkehrshaus
 Re 460 070	—
 Re 460 071	Mittelland
 Re 460 072	Reuss
 Re 460 073	Monte Ceneri
 Re 460 074	—
 Re 460 075	Schafmatt
 Re 460 076	Leventina
 Re 460 077	Chunnel
 Re 460 078	Monte Generoso
 Re 460 079	Weissenstein
 Re 460 080	Tre Valli
 Re 460 081	Pfänder
 Re 460 082	Ceresio
 Re 460 083	—
 Re 460 084	Helvetia (Temporarily 09/12/2006 - 08/2007 Neftenbach)
 Re 460 085	Pilatus
 Re 460 086	Ägerisee
 Re 460 087	Säuliamt
 Re 460 088	Limmat
 Re 460 089	Freiamt
 Re 460 090	Goffersberg
 Re 460 091	Werdenberg
 Re 460 092	Fridolin
 Re 460 093	Rhein
 Re 460 094	Rhätia
 Re 460 095	Bachtel
 Re 460 096	Furttal
 Re 460 097	Studenland
 Re 460 098	Balsberg
 Re 460 099	Bodensee
 Re 460 100	Tösstal
 Re 460 101	Bözberg
 Re 460 102	Lägern
 Re 460 103	Heitersberg
 Re 460 104	Toggenburg
 Re 460 105	Fürstenland
 Re 460 106	Munot
 Re 460 107	Glärnisch
 Re 460 108	Engadin
 Re 460 109	Alpstein
 Re 460 110	Mariaberg
 Re 460 111	Kempt
 Re 460 112	Thurtal
 Re 460 113	Irchel
 Re 460 114	Circus Knie
 Re 460 115	Heidiland
 Re 460 116	Ostschweiz
 Re 460 117	Zürichsee
 Re 460 118	Gotthard / Gottardo

List of alternate names due to special liveries:
See also: Re 460 special liveries (German Wikipedia)

Accidents and incidents

BLS
Swiss company BLS operates 18 similar locomotives, designated Re 465. These locomotives have efficiency modifications and individual axle control rather than individual bogie control which allows for slightly higher starting tractive effort, but are otherwise identical to the Re 460. Numbered 001–018, all are named. These locomotives are used for both passenger and freight duties by BLS.

List of names:
 001 Simplon/Sempione/Adler/Staatswappen Schweiz/Italien/BLS AplTransit/Lötschberg
 002 Gornergrat
 003 Jungfraujoch–Seespiele
 004 Mittelallalin-Valaistourisme
 005 Niesen
 006 Lauchernalp
 007 Schilthorn
 008 Niederhorn
 009 Napf
 010 Mont Vully
 011 Wisenberg
 012 Euro Tunnel
 013 Stockhorn
 014 Spalenberg
 015 Vue-des-Alpes
 016 Centovalli
 017 Schrattenflue
 018 Brienz Rothorn Bahn

Usage abroad

The MTR Corporation of Hong Kong also operates two Lok2000 variants for its cross-boundary service from Kowloon, Hong Kong to Guangzhou, China. They were introduced in 1998 when the service was operated by the KCRC; accordingly, the train is called the KTT, which stands for "KCR Through Train". These long-distance trains have ten double-deck carriages and are equipped with knuckle couplers, instead of buffers and chain couplers. While the train has two locomotives, it is not operated in push-pull mode.

The 46 Sr2 locomotives of VR (Finnish Railways) are closely based on the Re 460, as are the 22 NSB El 18 class used by Vy of Norway. Indian Railways WAP-5 electric locomotives are also based on the Re 460. The shape of the modified version of China Railways SS9 electric locomotives is similar to Re 460.

See also
 List of stock used by Swiss Federal Railways

References

This article was mostly translated from the German language version of December 2006.

SLM locomotives
Bo′Bo′ locomotives
15 kV AC locomotives
Re 460
Electric locomotives of Switzerland
Pininfarina
ABB locomotives
Standard gauge locomotives of Switzerland
Railway locomotives introduced in 1991